Ruth Shaw may refer to:

Ruth Shaw Wylie (1916–1989), United States-born composer and music educator
Ruth Faison Shaw (1888–1969), American artist and educator
Ruth Shaw (politician) (born 1920s), British politician
Ruth Geyer Shaw (born 1953), evolutionary biologist and former editor of the monthly scientific journal Evolution
Ruth G. Shaw (born 1948), former CEO of Duke Energy
Ruth Shaw (Prisoner), character from Australian TV series Prisoner, played by Mary Murphy
Ruth Shaw, character from the 1949 Western Down Dakota Way, played by Dale Evans

See also
Ruth L. Saw (1901–1986), British philosopher and aestheticist